Alex Kane (born October 21, 1993) is an American professional wrestler. He is currently signed to Major League Wrestling where he is a one time  MLW National Openweight Champion.

Professional wrestling career

Independent circuit (2018–present)
Kane defeated Aj styles in 2018 at a bullet Club reunion match 
On May 27, 2020 Kane made his final njpw Match against sanada
On February 4, 2023 Kane will be returning to njpw and he stated that he will be having a group called Apollo 56 
Apollo 56 will be featuring Aero Star and Calvin Tankman  and Lance Archer and Davey boy Smith Jr and led by Alex Kane

Major League Wrestling (2021–present)
On May 27, 2021, it was announced that Kane signed with MLW. He debuted at Battle Riot III, defeating Budd Heavy in the opening match and also entered in the eponymous Battle Riot match. At War Chamber, Kane won the vacant MLW National Openweight Championship in a five way ladder match. He successfully defended title against Aero Star and Calvin Tankman on January 13 and January 21, 2022 respectively at AZTECA and Fusion. On February 26, Special edition of Fusion: SuperFight he retained title in a three-way match against Calvin Tankman and ACH.

Championships and accomplishments
Major League Wrestling
MLW National Openweight Championship (1 time)
Paradigm Pro Wrestling
PPW Heavy Hitters Championship (1 time)
Fighting Spirit Heavyweight Grand Prix (2022)
Pro Wrestling Illustrated
Ranked No. 86 of the top 500 singles wrestlers in the PWI 500 in 2022
Wrestling United
Wrestling United Championship (1 time)

References

External links 
Alex Kane profile at Major League Wrestling
 

1993 births
Living people
People from Villa Rica, Georgia
American male professional wrestlers
African-American male professional wrestlers
Professional wrestlers from Georgia (U.S. state)
21st-century African-American sportspeople
Sportspeople from the Atlanta metropolitan area
MLW National Openweight Champions